"Girlfriend" is a song recorded by American singer-songwriter Charlie Puth, released on June 25, 2020. The song's cover art was revealed three days before its release.

Background and composition
The song was written by Puth and Jacob Kasher, several years before releasing it, while Puth was on the Voicenotes Tour. Puth set out to "reinvent" himself with the song, attributing Prince as an inspiration. Puth announced the release of the song on social media on June 22, 2020. He stated on Twitter that the song is one of his favorite songs that he's made. This song marks his first solo release of 2020. Puth stated in a press release that the song is about being persistent and "letting someone know that your feelings for them aren’t going to just go away". He has also said that this song was used to express his feelings because he is bad at communicating.

According to the sheet music published at Musicnotes.com by Alfred Publishing, the song is written in the key of D-flat major and is set in time signature of common time with a tempo of 100 beats per minute. Puth's vocal range spans two octaves, from E♭4 to E♭6.

Reception
Heran Mamo of Billboard referred to "Girlfriend" as a "swoon-worthy summer bop", praising the song's "infectious pop beat". In the United States, "Girlfriend" debuted and peaked at number 28 on the Digital Songs Sales chart for the issue dated July 11, 2020.

Music video
The music video for the song was released on July 9, 2020. The video shows Puth getting ready for a date at his house and then having a dance party. In a statement, Puth stated that this was his first video where he has showed his personality wholeheartedly. He has also said that the video represents what he wants people to do when they listen to his music.

Live performances

Puth performed the song on The Late Late Show with James Corden on June 25, 2020. He performed the song on the Today Show on July 3, 2020.

Track listings and formats
 Digital download / Streaming
 "Girlfriend"  – 2:57
 Digital download / Streaming
 "Girlfriend" (Live from Corden) – 2:59
 Digital download / Streaming
 "Girlfriend" (Haywyre Remix) – 2:38

Credits and personnel
Credits adapted from Tidal.

 Charlie Puth – producer, programmer, vocals, and writer
 Nili Harary – A&R Administration
 Jeremie Inhaber – assistant mixer
 Robin Florent – assistant mixer
 Scott Desmarais – assistant mixer
 Dmitry Gorodetsky – bass
 Jan Ozveren – guitar
 Chris Athens – masterer
 Manny Marroquin – mixer
 Chris Galland – mixing engineer
 Jacob Kasher Hindlin – writer

Charts

Release history

References

2020 singles
Charlie Puth songs
2020 songs
Songs written by Charlie Puth
Atlantic Records singles
Songs written by Jacob Kasher